The coat of arms of Gorzów Wielkopolski in Lubusz Voivodeship, Poland consists of the red eagle holding green clover flowers in each of its legs, placed in the white escutcheon.

Design 
The coat of arms of Gorzów Wielkopolski consists of the white Iberian style escutcheon (shield) with square top and rounded base. In its centre is placed a red eagle with its head facing left, and spread wings, and a red tongue put out. It has yellow (golden) beak, and clows at its legs. The eagle holds green clover flowers in each of its legs.

History 

The design of the coat of arms of the Gorzów Wielkopolski, originates from the coat of arms of the House of Ascania, which founded the city in 13th century. The coat of arms was related to the coat of arms of Brandenburg. Originally, the eagle did not hold a clover flowers, and presumably had its had facing right. The oldest known city seal depicting the eagle comes from 1351. It depicted it with its head facing left. The oldest known design to include the bird holding clover flowers, and placed in the white escutcheon (shield), comes from 1511 documents, although some historians, such as Otto Hupp, mark the first appearance as year 1444. The first known appearance of the colourful design, depicting a red eagle holding green clover flowers, placed in the white shield, was a painting on the city hall, done in 1719. Such colour scheme had been used ever since. In 1991, the city council adopted the city flag, based on the colours of the coat of arms.

In coat of arms stopped being oficil symbol in 1945, when the city was transferred to Poland, in the aftermath of World War II. Despite that, the city continued to unsocially use it as its symbol, for example placing it on city communication vehicles. Additionally, the were unsuccessful attempts to replace it with the design, that included a white eagle, on the red background, holding green clover flowers. The design was inspired by the coat of arms of Poland, and was meant to symbolize the allegiance of the city to Poland. The coat of arms depicting red eagle, was officially again adopted as the symbol of the city, on 8 March 1996.

See also 
 flag of Gorzów Wielkopolski

References 

Gorzów Wielkopolski
Gorzów Wielkopolski
Gorzów Wielkopolski
Gorzów Wielkopolski
Szczecin
1996 establishments in Poland